This is a list of the French Singles & Airplay Chart Review number-ones of 1979.

Summary

Singles chart

See also
1979 in music
List of number-one hits (France)

References

1979 in France
1979 record charts
Lists of number-one songs in France